Kathryn "Kathy" Jordan (born December 3, 1959) is a former American tennis player. During her career, she won seven Grand Slam titles, five of them in women's doubles and two in mixed doubles. She also was the 1983 Australian Open women's singles runner-up and won three singles titles and 42 doubles titles.

College
She received an athletic scholarship to Stanford University in 1978. While at Stanford, she won the 1979 AIAW Championships in singles and in doubles with her sister Barbara Jordan. in 1979, she won the Broderick Award (now the Honda Sports Award) as the best female collegiate player.

Career
Jordan turned professional in 1979. Her best performance in a Grand Slam singles tournament was runner-up at the 1983 Australian Open, where she lost to Martina Navratilova in straight sets..

She was the first player to defeat Chris Evert before the semifinals of a Grand Slam singles tournament. Jordan defeated Evert 6–1, 7–6 in the third round of Wimbledon in 1983 after Evert had reached at least the semifinals of her first 34 Grand Slam singles tournaments.

In women's doubles, Jordan won five Grand Slam titles, four of which were in partnership with Anne Smith. She also won a career Grand Slam in women's doubles, winning the 1980 French Open, 1980 and 1985 Wimbledon, 1981 US Open, and 1981 Australian Open.

In the Wimbledon final on July 6, 1985, Jordan and Elizabeth Smylie teamed to snap the 109-match winning streak of Navratilova and Pam Shriver by defeating them in three sets.

In mixed doubles, Jordan won two Grand Slam titles, 1986 French Open and 1986 Wimbledon, both of which were in partnership with Ken Flach.

Jordan retired in 1991. Her highest singles rank was world number five in 1984 and her highest doubles rank was world number 6 in 1991. She won several awards during her career, including 1979 WTA Most Impressive Newcomer Award, 1980 WTA Doubles Team of the Year Award with Smith, 1984 WTA Most Improved Player of the Year Award, and 1991 WTA Player Service Award

After retiring, Jordan returned to Stanford University and received a B.A. in political science in 1991. She was elected vice-president of the WTA in 1992. She also served as chairperson of the WTA Drug Testing Committee and served on WTA executive, deferred compensation, finance/marketing, and insurance committees through 1992.

In 2002, Jordan was presented with a Mentor Award by Martina Navratilova, on behalf of the WTA Tour, in recognition of her contribution to the Partners for Success program and to the sport of tennis at large.

Personal life
Jordan was one of the top juniors during the 1970s.  She also was a top high school basketball player, being named to the All-Conference basketball team while at Upper Merion Area High School in King of Prussia, Pennsylvania. Her sister won the 1979 Australian Open women's singles title. Her father, Bob Jordan, was instrumental in the development of the WTA deferred compensation plan. Now, Jordan lives in Palo Alto, California.

Major finals

Grand Slam finals

Singles: 1 (1 runner–up)

Women's doubles: 11 (5 titles, 6 runners-up)

Mixed doubles: 3 (2 titles, 1 runner–up)

Year-end championships finals

Doubles: 2 (1 title, 1 runner–up)

WTA career finals

Singles 13 (3–10)

Doubles 78 (42–36)

Grand Slam performance timelines

Singles

Doubles

Mixed doubles

Note: The Australian Open was held twice in 1977, in January and December.

References

External links
 
 
 

1959 births
Living people
American female tennis players
People from Bryn Mawr, Pennsylvania
People from Montgomery County, Pennsylvania 
Stanford Cardinal women's tennis players
Tennis people from Pennsylvania
Grand Slam (tennis) champions in women's doubles
Grand Slam (tennis) champions in mixed doubles
Wimbledon champions
US Open (tennis) champions
Australian Open (tennis) champions
French Open champions